Charles Okere Okoth (born 23 April 1981) is a Kenyan professional association football coach who is currently the assistant coach of the Harambee Stars, the Kenya national football team.

Career 
Okere served as coach at Mathare Youth Sports Association before moving to Nairobi-based club Kenya Commercial Bank S.C. (KCB) to serve as the assistant coach. In April 2018, he joined Kenyan Premier League side Tusker FC, as assistant coach to Robert Matano. Over there, he doubled as club's youth head coach. The duo helped team in winning 2020–21 FKF Premier League.

Kenya Women 
On 9 April 2021, Okere was appointed to serve as the assistant coach of the Kenya women's national football team to David Ouma, however on 12 April, he was appointed as head coach of the Harambee Starlets team replacing David Ouma, after he had parted ways with the Kenyan Federation on mutual consent. On 20 October 2021, in his first match in charge of the team, he led them to a 8–0 victory over South Sudan in the 2022 AFWCON qualification First round. In the second leg, Kenya won by 7–1, culminating to a 15–1 scoreline on aggregate. Okere doubles as the head coach of the Kenya women's national under-20 football team.

Vihiga Queens 
Okere was appointed as interim head coach of Vihiga Queens in late August 2021 after their long-serving coach Alex Alumirah parted ways with the club just one week to the 2021 CAF Champions League regional CECAFA qualifiers. Okere led the team to the final where they beat Commercial Bank of Ethiopia by 2–1 in the final at Moi International Sports Centre, Kasarani to qualify for the 2021 CAF Women's Champions League final tournament.

He continued his role as interim coach during the final tournament with the club being draw in the same group as  Mamelodi Sundowns (South Africa), ASAFAR Club (Morocco) and Rivers Angels (Nigeria). On 6 November 2021,they lost their first match by 1–0 against Mamelodi Sundowns Ladies. However, he led them to a 2–0 victory over ASFAR. After the competition, Boniface Nyamunyamu replaced him in a full time role.

Honours 
Vihiga Queens

 CECAFA Women's Champions League: 2021

References

External links 

 
 

1981 births
Living people
Kenyan football managers
Kenya women's national football team managers